Vice-Admiral James Gambier (1723–1789) was a Royal Navy officer who went on to be Commander-in-Chief, North American Station. The historian David Syrett presented a study of Gambier, which presented him as corrupt and largely disliked by his fellow officers.

Naval career
Gambier joined the Royal Navy in about 1740 being promoted to Lieutenant in 1743. Later he commanded  and took part in the capture of Louisbourg and the capture of Guadeloupe.

In 1770 he was appointed Commander-in-Chief, North American Station; this appointment had been predictable because of his connections with the Vice Admiral Sir Samuel Cornish. He was subsequently removed from control of the North American Station, following the rise of Lord Sandwich as First Lord of the Admiralty. In 1773 he was made Commissioner of Victualling Accounts on the Navy Board in an attempt to make amends to him for his political removal from his command in North America. In September of that same year Gambier was appointed commissioner of Portsmouth.  However, Gambier was not very successful or content with this position, as he was completely unprepared for managing a large civilian organization such as that at Portsmouth. After becoming rear-admiral of the red from seniority in 1778, he returned to North America and was briefly Commander-in-Chief of the North American Station again after resigning from the commissionership at Portsmouth. During his time in the post, Gambier was repeatedly accused of corruption and he was despised by many of his contemporaries.

In October 1783 he became Commander-in-Chief in the Jamaica Station. He was not well liked by his men and was once described as "this penurious old reptile". He retired in 1784.

Captain George Vancouver likely named Gambier Point, Alexander Archipelago, Alaska after Gambier in 1794.

Family

Gambier's nephew also became an admiral and later 1st Baron Gambier. Gambier's son, also James Gambier (1772–1844), was British consul-general to the Portuguese royal court from 1803. He followed the court's transfer to Rio de Janeiro, Brazil, in 1808, and returned to England in 1814. James Gambier the younger's illegitimate son was Royal Navy officer James Fitzjames, making him James Gambier the elder's grandson.

See also 
 James Fitzjames
 James Gambier, 1st Baron Gambier
 Port Royal

References

Sources

|-

|-

1723 births
1789 deaths
Royal Navy vice admirals
Royal Navy personnel of the Seven Years' War